Surendra Bikram Shah (1829–1881) was King of Nepal between 1847 and 1881. He became king after Prime Minister Jung Bahadur Rana forced the abdication of Surendra's father, Rajendra Bikram Shah. Surendra wielded little real power, with Jang Bahadur Rana effectively ruling the country during Surendra's reign.

Early life
Surendra was the son of King Rajendra and his first wife, Queen Samrajya. He was born the crown prince of Nepal and was relatively unpopular.

Name Surendra means "Chief of Deities".

Prince regent
Surendra's stepmother, Queen Rajya Lakshmi, was ambitious to have her son, Prince Ranendra, sit on the throne. However, Jung Bahadur, who was ambitious and wanted power, might have cooperated with Rajya Lakshmi for his own motive. After the Kot massacre, in which Jung Bahadur managed to eliminate a large number of nobles, Jung Bahadur turned against the queen, who in turn plotted to kill him (though the plot failed). Thinking Queen Rajya Lakshmi might be a threat to him, Jung Bahadur, who had become the prime minister, exiled Rajya Lakshmi to Varanasi. King Rajendra also accompanied her to Varanasi. Before leaving, he made Surendra the prince regent. However, later Jung Bahadur Rana forced the abdication of King Rajendra, and then Surendra was made the king.

Life as the king

King Surendra was like a prisoner in his own palace: with the exception of his immediate family, nobody could visit him without the permission of Jung Bahadur Rana. The king was only allowed to read literature. Frustrated at all these, the king wanted to abdicate in favor of his eldest son Trailokya, but the Rana prime minister did not allow it.

Surendra was allowed to meet his father, the ex-king Rajendra, once every month. Rajendra continued to live under house arrest until his death.

In 1856, King Surendra issued a sanad- which formalized the dominance and political leadership of the Kunwar family- the family of Jung Bahadur Rana. The king and his descendants could use the honorific title of 'Shri' five times with their names, while the members of the Kunwar family used the title thrice- placing the Kunwar family in a rank that was second only to the royal family. While Surendra remained the king (Maharajadhiraja), he had little power; Jung Bahadur Rana ruled the country.

Surendra's son, General and Crown Prince Trailokya Bir Bikram Shah Deva married three of Jung Bahadur Rana's daughters, Tara Rajya Lakhsmi Devi, Lalit Rajeshwori Rajya Lakshmi Devi and Hiranyagarbha Kumari Devi. Trilokya died in 1878, and Trilokya's son Prithvi Bir Bikram Shah became heir to the throne.

Death

Surendra died in 1881. His grandson Prithvi succeeded him as the king of Nepal.

References

External links
 History of the Shah Dynasty -- official site

|-

1829 births
1881 deaths
Nepalese monarchs
Nepalese Hindus
Shah dynasty
Hindu monarchs